The Santa Cruz District is one of 10 districts of the Huaylas Province in the Ancash Region of Peru. The capital of the district is Huaripampa.

Geography
The district is located in the central-eastern part of the province at an elevation of 2,900 m.

The Cordillera Blanca traverses the district. Some of the highest mountains of the district are listed below:

Ethnic groups 
The people in the district are mainly indigenous citizens of Quechua descent. Quechua is the language which the majority of the population (86.95%) learnt to speak in childhood, 12.63% of the residents started speaking using the Spanish language (2007 Peru Census).

See also 
 Allpamayu (river)
 Hatunqucha (Pirqarumi)
 Hatunqucha (Qaras)
 Ichikqucha
 Tawlliqucha
 Yuraqmayu
 Yuraqqucha

References

External links
  Official website of the Huaylas province
  Official website of the Santa Cruz district

Districts of the Huaylas Province
Districts of the Ancash Region